GVD may refer to:

 GVD (chemotherapy), a chemotherapy regimen
 Great Victoria Desert
 Group velocity dispersion,